The 1975 Miami Toros season was the third season of the team, and the club's ninth season in professional soccer.  This year, the team finished in second place of the Eastern Division.  They were a semifinalist in the North American Soccer League playoffs.

Background

Review

Competitions

NASL regular season

W = Wins, L = Losses, GF = Goals For, GA = Goals Against, PT= point system

6 points for a win,
1 point for a shootout win,
0 points for a loss,
1 point for each regulation goal scored up to three per game.

Results summaries

Results by round

Match reports

NASL Playoffs

Quarterfinals

Semifinals

Bracket

Match reports

Statistics

Transfers

References 

1975
Miami
Miami Toros
Miami